David McKean may refer to:

David McKean (diplomat), U.S. diplomat
Dave McKean (born 1963), English artist and graphic designer